Yaser Feyzi (born July 27, 1992) is an Iranian football winger who plays for Pars Jonoubi Jam.

Club career

Oxin Alborz
Feyzi joined 2nd Division side Oxin Alborz in the summer of 2015. He helped his team to promote to the second tiered Azadegan League and became top scorer with 19 goals in 27 games.

Zob Ahan
Feyzi joined Persian Gulf Pro League side Zob Ahan in June 2016 after a successful campaign in the Iranian third tier. He scored his first competitive goal in a 4–2 victory against Esteghlal Khuzestan in the 2016 Iranian Super Cup.

Club career statistics

References

External links 
 Yaser Feyzi at IranLeague.ir
 Yaser Feyzi at PersianLeague.com

1992 births
Living people
Zob Ahan Esfahan F.C. players
Iranian footballers
People from Hormozgan Province
Iran under-20 international footballers
Association football midfielders